William Raymond Acquavella (born 1937/38) is an American art dealer and gallerist, and the head of Acquavella Galleries.

Early life
William Raymond Acquavella is the son of Nicholas Acquavella, who founded Acquavella Galleries in 1921, and Edythe Acquavella. He was educated at Westminster School in Simsbury, Connecticut.

Career
In 1992, he became Lucian Freud's dealer, agreeing to settle Freud's £2.7 million in gambling debts.

Acquavella negotiated the sale of a Picasso painting from Steve Wynn to Steve Cohen for $139 million, but it fell through when Wynn put his elbow through the painting.

Forbes included Acquavella in their list of the top ten art dealers.

Personal life
Acquavella's own art collection is "dominated by Picasso, Matisse, and Miró", as well as Bonnard and Léger.

On May 21, 1966, in Shelburne, Vermont, Acquavella married Hope Brown, daughter of Mr. and Mrs. Archibald M. Brown. In 2000, their daughter Eleanor Hope Acquavella, then treasurer of Acquavella Galleries, married Morgan Andre Grace Dejoux.

Before 1990, Acquavella married his second wife, Donna. He has three children.

References

Living people
American art collectors
American art dealers
Year of birth uncertain
Westminster School (Connecticut) alumni
Year of birth missing (living people)